The Khosro Agha hammam was a historical hammam in Iran. It was located in the Sepah street in Isfahan and belonged to the Safavid era.

Its dressing room was changed to a store in 1975 and was damaged heavily, but then it was repaired. After a while, the extension of Ostandari street (Now: Hakim street) was decided, but because of passing of the street from the hammam, this project was canceled. In 1979, some of neighborhood residents rumored that vice and harlotry took place in the hammam and the hammam should be destroyed. Their motive for this rumor was that they wanted the new street to be constructed and consequently the costs of their estates to be increased. Finally in 1980 a bomb exploded in the hammam and only some columns remained from Garmkhaneh (hothouse).

In 1992, the supreme council of the city planning disapproved the construction of a new street because of the location of the hammam in the neighborhood. Finally on 12 April 1995 at 2 o'clock in the midnight some unidentified people attacked the Khosro Agha hammam and after that they made the guard unconscious, they destroyed completely this historical structure and stole its unique stone trough.

References

Buildings and structures in Isfahan
Tourist attractions in Isfahan Province
Demolished buildings and structures in Iran
Public baths
Public baths in Iran